Glenn Doyle (born 3 March 1965 in Sydney, New South Wales) is a retired Australian Motorcycle speedway rider. Doyle is a twice Australian Champion and won the Western Australian Championship in his adopted state on six occasions.

Career

Australia
Glenn Doyle began his speedway career in the mid-1980s in Perth, Western Australia, and quickly rose to prominence as WA's best solo rider, becoming a regular winner at the  Claremont Speedway. He first won the WA State Championship in 1989 and went on to win that years Australian Championship on the opposite side of the country at the  Newcastle Motordrome in Newcastle, NSW. Going into the final heat of the night (Heat 20), Doyle needed a win to take the title. He was in second place behind NSW rider Mick Poole going into the last lap, but pulled off a miraculous pass on the final turn to win his maiden Australian championship. Before the meeting Doyle was considered one of the riders who would just be making up the numbers and surprised many with his win.

Doyle repeated as WA champion in 1990 to qualify for the Australian final. Despite being the defending champion, Doyle was again not considered amongst the favourites for the 1990 Australian Championship held at the  Brisbane Exhibition Ground. Once again the Western Australian defied his critics by finishing the heats in equal first place with 14 out of a possible 15 points, forcing a run-off with exciting young Victorian rider and future 10 time national champion Leigh Adams. Doyle defeated Adams in the run-off to claim his second straight Australian championship. He did it the hard way in his heat races, coming from behind to win 4 races and finish second in the other.

After winning the WA title for the third year in succession, Doyle would finish runner up to Sydney's Craig Boyce in the 1991 Australian Championship in Alice Springs. Both went into their final heat at the near circular  Arunga Park Speedway unbeaten in their first four rides. With Boyce winning the start, Doyle was unable to get past and had to settle for second in both the race and the championship. He won his 4th WA championship in succession in 1992, before finishing 5th in the 1992 Australian Championship at the tight  North Arm Speedway in Adelaide. After being the only undefeated rider following the second round of heats at North Arm, Doyle finished third, second and third again in his final three rides. He then lost a three-way run-off for fourth place, finishing second to Mildura's Jason Lyons and ending his chance of progressing to the next round of the 1992 Speedway World Championship, the Commonwealth Final at King's Lynn in England.

Glenn Doyle created history by winning his fifth straight WA state title in 1993, but his run was stopped when he finished second to Steve Johnston in 1994, though he would regain his crown in 1995. Doyle holds the record for WA title wins with six.

While also successful on smaller tracks, Doyle was generally considered to be at his best on larger,  or longer tracks.

After retiring from riding in the mid-1990s, Glenn Doyle came out of retirement on 31 March 2000 along with other former Perth riders such as Glyn Taylor, to ride a series of match races at the final meeting of the Claremont Speedway which was closing after 73 years. Doyle won most of his races on the night showing he had lost none of his style or speed in retirement.

England
In 1986, Doyle started racing in England during the Australian winter months. Between 1986 and 1993 he rode for Long Eaton, Belle Vue Aces, Hackney Kestrels, Sheffield Tigers, Oxford Cheetahs, Swindon Robins, Ipswich Witches, Reading Racers, Bradford Dukes, Eastbourne Eagles and the King's Lynn Stars.

With the Bradford Dukes who raced out of the Odsal Stadium, Doyle was team mate to such riders as 1992 World Champion Gary Havelock, and multiple Long track World Champion Simon Wigg.

International
Glenn Doyle represented Australia on several occasions throughout his career, both in Australia and overseas. He raced against other international teams including England, Sweden, and Poland. He also captained Western Australia in two challenges against a visiting team from Russia in 1991.

References

1965 births
Living people
Motorcycle racers from Sydney
Australian speedway riders
Sheffield Tigers riders
Bradford Dukes riders
Oxford Cheetahs riders